The Riots is a play created by Gillian Slovo from spoken evidence, which explains and evaluates the events that took place during the 2011 England riots. The play is written in the style of verbatim theatre using interviews from politicians, police, rioters and victims involved in the riots. The Riots first opened at the Tricycle Theatre in Kilburn on 22 November 2011, after previewing from 17 November 2011.

Context
On 6 August 2011 rioting broke out in Tottenham, London in reaction to the death of Mark Duggan, who was shot dead by a police officer on 4 August. Over the next four nights the rioting spread, affecting other areas of London and the rest of England. Serious rioting, looting, assault, and damage to property and businesses took place in cities all over England. Less than two weeks after the initial rioting on 6 August, police forces throughout England had made nearly 3,000 arrests. The government refused to hold a full public enquiry into the causes of the rioting. Nicholas Kent, artistic director of The Riots, contacted Gillian Slovo only days after the rioting began and together they created a dramatic response to these terrible events, which they claimed would answer some questions.

Overview
The Riots is staged in two-halves. The first half gives a thorough and vivid image of how the riots unfolded and spread from city to city. This is told through witness accounts from rioters, police officers, onlookers and local residents, in particular Mohamed Hammoudan, whose house was burnt down. The second half reflects on the riots, using interviews from politicians, rioters, police, teachers, community leaders, lawyers and social workers, analysing why the riots occurred, for what reasons and how society and the government can learn from them. Slovo has compiled a plurality of voices, in an unbiased manner, which describes, discusses and questions the causes of the 2011 England Riots.

Characters
Diane Abbott MP
HH Judge Robert Atherton
John Azah
Camila Batmanghelidjh
Martin Sylvester Brown
Dr Barbara Cleaver
Chief Inspector Graham Dean
Sergeant Paul Evans
Iain Duncan Smith MP
Harry Fletcher
Judge Andrew Gilbart QC
Michael Gove MP
Mohamed Hammoudan
Simon Hughes MP
Chelsea Ives
Owen Jones
Sadie King
Superintendent Leroy Logan
Karyn McCluskey
John McDonnell MP
Revs Nims Obunge
Sir Hugh Orde
Greg Powell
Jacob Sakil
Stafford Scott
David Swarbrick
Inspector Winter
Man 1
Man 2
Man 3

Original cast
The original cast consisted of fourteen actors playing 30 characters: Michele Austin, Sarah Ball, Kingsley Ben-Adir, Grant Burgin, Christopher Fox, Rupert Holliday Evans, Clementine Marlowe-Hunt, Okezie Morro, Cyril Nri, Tom Padley, Alan Parnaby, Selva Rasalingam, Steve Toussaint and Tim Woodward.

Transfer
After a sell out show and 4 star reviews from major newspapers including The Guardian and The Daily Telegraph the production of The Riots closed at the Tricycle Theatre on 10 December 2011. The Riots transferred to the Bernie Grant Arts Centre in Tottenham from 4–14 January 2012.

References

Further reading
 Slovo Gillian, ′The Riots′ Oberon Books Ltd. (17 November 2011)

External links
 Tricycle Theatre Official Website 

English plays
2011 England riots
2011 plays
Docudrama plays